Mario Velarde Velázquez (29 March 1940 – 19 August 1997) was a Mexican football midfielder, who played for the Selección de fútbol de México (Mexico national team) between 1962 and 1972. He was part of the Mexico squad for the FIFA World Cup tournaments (1962) and 1970).

Career
Born in San Ángel, Velarde played football for Necaxa and Pumas. He scored 64 league goals for Pumas. Velarde Coached the Mexican Youth Team in the 1983 FIFA World Youth Championship.

References

External links
 
 
 Biography of Mario Velarde 

1940 births
1997 deaths
Association football midfielders
Mexico international footballers
1962 FIFA World Cup players
1970 FIFA World Cup players
Club Universidad Nacional footballers
Club Necaxa footballers
Club Universidad Nacional managers
Cruz Azul managers
Deportivo Toluca F.C. managers
Mexico national football team managers
Footballers from Mexico City
Liga MX players
Mexican footballers
Mexican football managers